Pathankot is a city and the district headquarters of the Pathankot district in Punjab, India. Pathankot is the 6th most populous city of Punjab, after Ludhiana, Amritsar, Jalandhar, Patiala and Bathinda. Its local government is a municipal corporation.

Situated in the picturesque foothills of Kangra and Dalhousie, with the river Chakki flowing close by, the city is often used as a rest-stop before heading into the mountains of Jammu and Kashmir, Dalhousie, Chamba, Kangra, Dharamshala, Mcleodganj, Jwalaji, Chintpurni and further into the Himalayas. Pathankot also serves as an education hub for the nearby areas of Jammu & Kashmir and Himachal Pradesh. Many rural students of these states come to Pathankot for education.

History
Pathankot is an ancient city and has historical significance. From various accounts; It may be believed that Audumbara was the name of it. Numerous coins of great antiquity found at Pathankot prove that it is one of the oldest sites in the Punjab (that has been divided after the partition in 1947). It must always have been a place of great significance as it is situated in the foot plains of the hills.

Pathankot was the capital of Nurpur State and its name was changed to Dhameri (Nurpur) during the Akbar reign. The Pathania clan of Rajput derived its name from Pathankot.

After independence
During partition, the initial plan by border demarcation committee was to place Pathankot (part of Gurdaspur district that time) into Pakistan and Shakargarh district into India. However, as a later fine tuning of decision vice versa was done i.e. Shakargarh district was given to Pakistan and Gurdaspur district (along Pathankot) was given to India.

Geography

It is a green town surrounded by the Ravi and Chakki rivers. Shiwalik foothills on the south and east and snow-capped Himalayas in the back drop in north.

Average temperature
 Spring: The climate remains the most enjoyable part of the year during the spring season (from mid-February to mid-April). Temperatures vary between (max) 16 °C to 25 °C and (min) 9 °C to 18 °C.
 Autumn: In autumn (from mid-September to mid November.), the temperature may rise to a maximum of 30 °C. Temperatures usually remain between 16° to 27° in autumn. The minimum temperature is around 11 °C.
 Summer: The temperature in summer (from mid-May to mid-June) may rise to a maximum of 46 °C (rarely). Temperatures generally remain between 34 °C to 46 °C (91 – 115F).
 Monsoon: During monsoon(from mid-June to mid-September), Pathankot receives moderate to heavy rainfall and sometimes heavy to very heavy rainfall (generally during the month of August or September). Usually, the rain bearing monsoon winds blow from south-west/ south-east. Mostly, the city receives heavy rain from south (which is mainly a persistent rain) but it generally receives most of its rain during monsoon either from North-west or North-east. Maximum amount of rain received by the city of Pathankot during monsoon season is 195.5 mm in a single day.
 Winter: Winters (November to mid-March) are mild but it can sometimes get quite chilly in Pathankot. Average temperatures in the winter remain at (max) 7 °C to 15 °C and (min) 0 °C to 8 °C. Rain usually comes from the west during winters and it is usually a persistent rain for 2–3 days with sometimes hail-storms. Pathankot experienced snowfall in 2012 after almost 55 years.

Politics
The city is part of the Pathankot Assembly Constituency.

Facilities
Government of Pathankot had constructed 4 public toilets in 2018 but they had been opened for only 6 days so as to get good rankings in surveys. You can find them at various places where they charge you 10/- but you can avail general conveniences in a clean environment

Transport
Pathankot is well connected by rail and road with the rest of the country.  Pathankot is connected by a vast network of private and public-sector bus services to other cities in Punjab, Himachal Pradesh, Delhi, Haryana, Jammu and Kashmir. Important destinations include Delhi, Manali Chandigarh, Jammu, Dharamshala, Dalhousie and Amritsar. Pathankot is used as a gateway for Chamba and Kangra Valley in Himachal Pradesh and for various locations in Jammu and Kashmir like Jammu City Mansar Lake, Srinagar, Udhampur, Holy Cave at Amarnath, Patni Top and Holy Cave of Mata Vaishno Devi (Katra) 155 km away from Pathankot.

One can take an auto rickshaw or a cycle rickshaw.

Traffic management is poor in the city. No traffic lights are there in the city.

By Air
 Pathankot Airport is a domestic airport serving Pathankot with scheduled flight operations to/from New Delhi by Alliance Air under the UDAN Scheme. The nearest International Airport, however is located in Amritsar.

Train
It has direct train links with Delhi, Jammu and other Indian cities. All trains going to Jammu pass through Pathankot Cantt Station. The important trains include Rajdhani, Swaraj Express, Pooja Express, Shri Shakti Express. Super fast trains do not enter Pathankot Station in City. The distance from Pathankot Junction & Pathankot Cant Railway station is just 4 km.

Pathankot Railway Station under A-category. Pathankot is a major railroad junction. Lines from Amritsar (2 hrs) and Delhi (8 hrs) merge here, and all services to Jammu (2 hrs) pass through. In addition to Pathankot station itself, there is a second station called Chakki Bank renamed Pathankot Cantt just 4 km away, which serves some express trains that do not stop in Pathankot station. Nowadays the majority of the Jammu trains stop only at Pathankot Cantt Railway Station and not at Pathankot Railway Station.

Pathankot is also served by the narrow-gauge Kangra Valley Railway (a.k.a. Kangra Toy Train) built by the British, which crawls 128 km through stunning scenery to Joginder Nagar via Palampur and Kangra (near Dharamsala). However, the luxury Kangra Queen services were terminated in 2003, leaving about six departures daily of slow, often packed second class trains, taking over six hours. Bookings for these can only be done locally at Pathankot station. Some of these trains run to Baijnath Paprola and a few to Joginder Nagar. The main stations on this line include Kangra and Palampur, although Dalhousie and Dharmasala are not on the line. The town is the lower terminus of the Kangra Valley Railway, thereby connecting the mountainous regions of western Himachal Pradesh to the network of Indian Railways.

Bus
Maharana Pratap Inter State Bus Terminal Pathankot. It's close to the Pathankot Junction Railway station.
Public buses to Dharamshala Dalhousie take 3–4 hours. while buses to Amritsar take 3 hours.
Dalhousie famous destination for honeymoon couples is at just 80 km from Pathankot.
The famous Hindu Pilgrimage Vaishno devi is just 160 km from Pathankot.
Chandigarh is 4–5 hours away. It is well connected with bus services from Punjab roadways, Haryana Roadways, Himachal Roadways J&K transport, and private AC volvo buses.

One can stop over in Pathankot en route to Gurdaspur(35 km), Mukerian (40), Joginder Nagar (149 km), Dharamshala (88 km), Dalhousie (100 km), Amritsar (108), Palampur (112 km), Chamba (100 km) & Jammu (100 km), Hoshiarpur (100 km), Kangra (86 km), Jalandhar (108 km), Srinagar (400 km) all in different directions from Pathankot via Jalandhar-Srinagar National highway (NH-44), Dabwali-Pathankot National highway (NH-54) and Pathankot-Mandi National highway (NH-154).

Economy

Pathankot is a commercial center. Wholesellers and distributors of consumer goods cater to Himachal Pradesh, Jammu & Kashmir and northwest Punjab.

Demographics
As per data of 2011 census Pathankot urban agglomeration had a population of 159,909, out of which males were 84,145 and females were 75,764. The literacy rate was 88.71 per cent.

Most common language here is Punjabi.

Sports
On 8 November 2014, Punjab Deputy CM Sukhbir Singh Badal laid the foundation stone for a stadium in Pathankot. But even after 6 years, the stadium is still incomplete. Sportspeople struggle to get any facilities in Pathankot. There are no proper grounds to practice. So they go to other cities, while most of the young population pursue other careers.

Tourist places
Pathankot city is surrounded by both the Shivalik range, part of which makes up the foothills of the Himalayas, and the river Chakki. Places near Pathankot include Shahpur Kandi with a hanging rest house, Ranjit Sagar Dam which is the highest gravity dam in Asia. Madhopur (Madhopur, Punjab) head works which date back to the Mughal era. head works of Upper Bari Doab, Shahpur Kandi are the attractions of this area. Keshopur Chhamb is home to many Migratory Birds and is only major natural wetland in the state.

There is a fortress called the Nurpur Fort built by the Pathania Rajputs, more than 900 years ago. The temple is also built there named Brij Raj Swami devoted to Lord Krishna and Mira Bai, the only place where idols of both are worshipped. It was damaged due to the earthquake which struck in 1905 A.D., 25 km from Pathankot.  It is 25 km away from Pathankot.
Jugial Township, is located 15 km (approx) from Pathankot. This place has greenery all around and one Shri Laxmi Narayan Mandir which is the biggest among the nearby areas. There is also Singh Sabha Gurudwara near Shri Laxmi Narayan Mandir.
A Hydraulic Research Station at the Upper Bari Doab Canal is situated at Malikpur, Pathankot which is 7 km from Pathankot, where various models of Dams and Irrigation Canals are made before actual work starts upon them.
Dalhousie is snowy in winter, and nearby Khajjiar has been described as an "Indian Switzerland" due to its scenery and activities such as balloon riding, paragliding, and horseback riding.
For religious trips like Jwala ji (130 km), Chintpurni (130 km), Pathankot is a place to rest before heading to the hill route the next morning. A Grand Ranjit Sagar Dam (earthen Dam made of mud and not concrete) is a 100 km water reservoir. Chinmayya Temple (Swami Chinmayya Nand) is on the way to Yol, India Camp (100 km). This is the place where the German Soldiers (POW) were kept in confinement after the Second World War by the British.

The Union Ministry for Forests, Environment and Climate Change has given the long-awaited signal to develop the twin islands of Kalara and Palangi, located in the midst of the Ranjit Sagar Dam Lake, as world class tourist spots.

Notable people

 Wazir Ram Singh Pathania (Freedom Fighter)
 Sunny Deol (MP)
 Vinod Khanna (MP)
 Rajendar Nath Rehbar (Poet (Shaayar in Urdu) and Lyricist)
 Master Mohan Lal (Ex. MLA)
 Siddarth Kaul (Cricketer)
 Rajbeer Singh (Actor)
 Dev Anand (Actor)
 Jagmohan Kaur (singer)

See also
 Bhoa village

References

 
Cities and towns in Pathankot district